Oligodon booliati, also known as the Boo-Liat's kukri snake, is a species of snake of the family Colubridae. It is endemic to the Tioman Island, Malaysia. The snake was named for Malaysian zoologist Lim Boo Liat.

Habitat and conservation
Oligodon booliati is a fossorial species that is found on leaf litter in lowland forest. Its range is restricted to the forested area of the Tioman Island, which is suffering from deforestation and could see the remaining forest disappearing in the near future.

References 

booliati
Snakes of Southeast Asia
Reptiles of Malaysia
Endemic fauna of Malaysia
Critically endangered fauna of Asia
Reptiles described in 2004